Molly Kearney (born May 2, 1992) is an American actor and stand-up comedian. In 2022, they became a featured cast member on Saturday Night Live.

Kearney uses they/them pronouns.

Life and career

Born and raised in Cleveland, they frequently performed stand-up comedy in Chicago, later moving to Los Angeles.

In 2019, Kearney was one of the comedians selected for Comedy Central's "Up Next" showcase after a nationwide search.

Kearney's screen credits include the Amazon series A League of Their Own and the Disney+ series The Mighty Ducks: Game Changers. In 2022, they were announced as the first openly non-binary cast member of Saturday Night Live.

References

External links

Bio from NBC

Year of birth missing (living people)
21st-century American actors
21st-century American comedians
Actors from Cleveland
American non-binary actors
American sketch comedians
American stand-up comedians
Comedians from Ohio
Non-binary comedians
Living people
American LGBT comedians
1992 births